Tao:  The Watercourse Way is a 1975 non-fiction book on Taoism and philosophy, and is Alan Watts' last book. It was published posthumously in 1975 with the collaboration of Al Chung-liang Huang, who also contributed a preface and afterword, and with additional calligraphy by Lee Chih-chang.

Synopsis
This short book (five chapters, with a Preface, Bibliography, etc.) provides a distillation of Watt's view of Taoism accompanied by historical information. Linguistic issues are highlighted and calligraphic samples of many of the cited Chinese texts are included.  As described in Huang's Preface, Watts had planned two further chapters showing how Taoism could be "medicine for the ills of the West", but these were unwritten at the time of Watts' death in 1973.

Reception
Kirkus Reviews praised the work, and stated that it was a "Good introduction to the Tao." Joseph Needham also wrote favorably of Tao: The Watercourse Way and called it an "admirable introduction to Taoist philosophy and its symbolism".

References

1975 non-fiction books
Philosophy books
Taoist texts
Books by Alan Watts
Pantheon Books books